Acraga concolor is a moth from the family Dalceridae. It is found in Venezuela, Suriname, French Guiana, northern Brazil (Amazon Basin), Ecuador, Peru and Bolivia. The habitat consists of tropical moist, tropical wet, tropical premontane rain, tropical premontane wet and subtropical moist forests.

The length of the forewings is 9–10 mm. Adults are light yellow, but the dorsal forewings are darker than the hindwings. Adults are on wing year-round.

References

Dalceridae
Moths described in 1865